David William Rabe (born March 10, 1940) is an American playwright and screenwriter.  He won the Tony Award for Best Play in 1972 (Sticks and Bones) and also received Tony Award nominations for Best Play in 1974 (In the Boom Boom Room), 1977 (Streamers) and 1985 (Hurlyburly).

Early life 

Rabe was born on March 10, 1940, in Dubuque, Iowa, of German and Irish descent, the son of Ruth ( McCormick), a department store worker, and William Rabe, a teacher and meat packer. He was raised in a devout Catholic family.

Career 

Rabe was drafted into the U.S. Army in 1965 and served in a medical unit during the Vietnam War. After leaving the Army in 1967, Rabe returned to Villanova University, studying writing and earning an M.A. in 1968.

During this time, he began work on the play Sticks and Bones, in which the family represents the ugly underbelly of the seemingly stereotypical  Nelson family (whose names match the main characters of the sunny 1950s television series -- Ozzie, Harriet, David and Ricky) when they are faced with their embittered and hopeless son David returning home from Vietnam as a blinded vet.

Rabe is known for his loose trilogy of plays drawing on his experiences as an Army draftee in Vietnam, Sticks and Bones (1969), the Tony Award-winning The Basic Training of Pavlo Hummel (1971), and Streamers (1976).  

He has also written Hurlyburly (both the play and the screenplay for the film version), and the screenplays for the Vietnam War drama Casualties of War (1989) and the film adaptation of John Grisham's The Firm (1993). Rabe also wrote a screenplay for First Blood for producer Martin Bregman with Mike Nichols interested in directing and the role of John Rambo written for Al Pacino, but it was not filmed because Pacino found it "too extreme" and declined to appear in it.  

A collection of Rabe's manuscripts is housed in the Mugar Memorial Library, at Boston University.

Awards and honors
1967 Rockefeller Foundation Grant
1970 Associated Press Award, for a series on Daytop addict rehabilitation program
1971 Obie Award for distinguished playwriting for The Basic Training of Pavlo Hummel
1971 Drama Desk Award for The Basic Training of Pavlo Hummel
1971 Elizabeth Hull/Kate Warriner Award from Dramatists Guild for The Basic Training of Pavlo Hummel and Streamers
1972 New York Drama Critics Circle citation
1972 Outer Critics Circle Award for Best Play in 1972 for Sticks and Bones
1972 Tony Award for Best Play in 1972 for Sticks and Bones
1974 Tony Award nominee for Best Play for In the Boom Boom Room
1976 National Institute and American Academy Award in Literature
1976 Guggenheim Fellowship
1977 Tony Award nominee for Best Play for Streamers
1977 New York Drama Critics Circle Award for Best American Play for Streamers
1985 Tony Award nominee for Best Play for Hurlyburly
2014 PEN/Laura Pels International Foundation for Theater Award Master American Dramatist

Works

Plays
 Chameleon (1959)
 The Basic Training of Pavlo Hummel (1971)
 Sticks and Bones (1971)
  The Orphan (1972)
 In the Boom Boom Room (1973)
 Burning (1974)
 The Crossing (1975)
 Streamers (1976)
 Goose and Tomtom (1982)
 Hurlyburly (1984)
 Those the River Keeps (1991)
 A Question of Mercy: Based upon the Journal by Richard Selzer (1997)
 The Dog Problem (2001)
 The Black Monk (2004)
 An Early History of Fire (2012)
 Good for Otto (2015)
 Visiting Edna (2016)

Screenplays
 I'm Dancing as Fast as I Can (1982)
 Streamers (1983)
 Casualties of War (1989)
 State of Grace (with Dennis McIntyre, 1990)
 The Firm (with Robert Towne and David Rayfiel, 1993)
 Hurlyburly (1998)
 In the Boom Boom Room (adapted from his play, 1999)

Fiction
 Recital of the Dog (1993)
 The Crossing Guard (novelization of the screenplay by Sean Penn, 1995)
 A Primitive Heart (2005)
 Dinosaurs on the Roof (2008)
 Mr. Wellington (children's book, illustrated by Robert Andrew Parker, 2009)
 Girl by the Road at Night: A Novel of Vietnam (2010)

References

External links

Hollywood.com
Answers.com
 Filmography at The New York Times
Encyclopædia Britannica

Further reading
 "David Rabe's America"
 Radavich, David.  "Collapsing Male Myths: Rabe's Tragicomic Hurlyburly."  American Drama 3:1 (Fall 1993): 1–16.
 Radavich, David.  "Rabe, Mamet, Shepard, and Wilson: Mid-American Male Dramatists of the 1970s and '80s." The Midwest Quarterly XLVIII: 3 (Spring 2007): 342–58.

1940 births
Living people
20th-century American dramatists and playwrights
United States Army personnel of the Vietnam War
American male screenwriters
Obie Award recipients
Writers from Dubuque, Iowa
Villanova University alumni
Tony Award winners
Drama Desk Award winners
American male dramatists and playwrights
Screenwriters from New York (state)
Screenwriters from Iowa
United States Army soldiers
20th-century American male writers